was a Japanese politician. He served as finance minister of Japan from 1978 to 1979.

Career
Kaneko was a member of the Liberal Democratic Party (LDP) and part of the Ikeda faction led by Hayato Ikeda. Kaneko was the chairman of the LDP's tax system research council. He ran for Diet seat in the 1960 general election as a member of the Ikeda faction.

He worked at the ministry of finance as bureaucrat and had experience on tax policy. He served as the head of the Osaka Tax Bureau until 1978.

He was appointed minister of finance in the Masayoshi Ohira's cabinet on 8 December 1978, replacing Tatsuo Murayama in the post. Kaneko was in office until 8 November 1979. He was part of the faction led by Masayoshi Ohira in the LDP during this period. Then Kaneko served as the director of the Economic Planning Agency (EPA) in the mid-1980s.

Personal life
Kaneko's eldest son Kazuyoshi Kaneko is also a politician and held different cabinet portfolios, including transport minister.

References

External links

|-

20th-century Japanese politicians
1913 births
1989 deaths
Liberal Democratic Party (Japan) politicians
Ministers of Finance of Japan
Politicians from Gifu Prefecture